The Football Cup of Greater Greece (officially the Cup of Friendship between Mother Greece and Daughter Cyprus) was a two match competition held usually during the Easter period and contested by previous season's winners of the Cypriot Cup and the Greek Cup. It was held between 1969 and 1976.

Winners

Cypriot teams in the Greek league
Also, from 1967 until 1974, the Cypriot Champions were promoted to the Greek First National Division and, in case of relegation, they were replaced by the Cypriot Champions of the next season. Cypriot teams were relegated every season from the Alpha Ethniki, apart from 1974, when APOEL managed to remain in the Greek Championship. However, due to the Turkish invasion of Cyprus that year, APOEL withdrew from the League.

See also
 Super League Greece
 Greek Football Cup
 Cypriot First Division
 Cypriot Cup

References

Cypriot football friendly trophies
Greek football friendly trophies